The Uni-President 7-Eleven Lions, stylized as Uni-President 7-ᴇʟᴇᴠᴇn Lions, also known as Uni-Lions, are a professional baseball team playing in the Chinese Professional Baseball League (CPBL). The Lions are based in Tainan City, Taiwan, and homefielded primary at Tainan Municipal Baseball Stadium.

The organization is owned by Uni-President Corporation, one of Taiwan's largest conglomerates, whose subsidiary Uni-President Baseball Team Company oversees operations of the team. The Lions are the only CPBL team owned by the same parent company and played continuously since CPBL's founding season in 1990.

History

Amateur era
The team was first established as amateur Uni-President Baseball Team in 1989 for the purpose of training and preparation for eventual professionalization in the next year. The corporation originally intended to recruit players from Taipower Baseball Team, an amateur baseball team based in nearby Kaohsiung, but faced many difficulties in the process.

Uni-President originally offered Lin Chia-hsiang the position of team manager, hoping that his status as Taipower's head coach would ensure players' willingness to join the new team. Lin accepted at first, and agreed to aid the effort of recruiting players. However, due to uncertainties in a professional career, players were reluctant to leave Taipower for the new team, and Lin could only secure a few players and was far below the 15 players minimum requirement of the amateur league. Lin then turned down the offer, leaving Uni-President searching for a replacement for the manager position. Uni-President eventually contacted Cheng Kuen-chi and offered him the position. Cheng, a former coach of Taipower who was respected by many players, accepted the offer and became the first manager for Uni-President. Cheng then used his connection to convince players to join the team, and Uni-President barely met the minimum requirement after Brother baseball team lent players to Uni-President. The team then participated and performed modestly in two amateur series in 1989.

Early years
The team was professionalized on January 1, 1990, following the establishment of CPBL. Uni-President chose Lions as its mascot, and hence the team was renamed Uni-President Lions. The Lions played the opening game of CPBL on March 17, 1990 with Brother Elephants in the now demolished Taipei Municipal Baseball Stadium, defeated the Elephants, and scored their first victory in professional baseball. However, the Lions performed poorly in their first professional season, placed third and only saved by Brother Elephants's even poorer performance.

The season of 1991 saw significant improvements in the Lions' performance. The Lions were able to advance into the playoffs and play Wei Chuan Dragons, who they defeated four games to two and won their first title. The next three years saw the dominance of the Elephants, who won three consecutive seasonal titles from 1992 to 1994, and defeated the Lions in the 1993 playoffs. It was during these years that the Lions and Elephants developed a long-lasting rivalry. The Lions again won the titles in 1995 and 1996.

Black Eagles scandal and the 1997 season
The 1997 season was not smooth sailing as many has expected; the Lions started out losing some prominent players to the rival Taiwan Major League. Also, the game-fixing scandal in mid-season of 1997, known as the Black Eagles scandal, was a major blow to the CPBL in general in that the average attendance dropped significantly, and teams were either forced out of the market or had to scale back on the budget and shut down some expansion projects over the next few years.

Furthermore, at the end of 1997 season, the Lions led the league with 58–7–31, while the Dragons (46–4–46) and the Eagles (41–4–51) were placed third and fourth respectively. However, the regulation dictated that the playoffs should be played by the team that led the league in the first half-season and the team in the second half-season. It was assumed that if a team leads the league in the whole year, it should have placed first in both half-seasons, and thus allowed to participate in the championship series. The loophole became obvious when the Dragons, placed seventh in the first half but first in the second half, and the Eagles, placed first in the first half and seventh in the second half, got a berth in the playoffs. The loophole was fixed in the following year.

Present
The team was officially renamed Uni-President 7-Eleven Lions in 2008. 7-Eleven in Taiwan is franchised by President Chain Store Corporation, a subsidiary of Uni-President Enterprises Corporation; each entity now owns roughly half of the shares of the Lions.

Organization

Minor league
The Lions were credited as the first organization to form a minor league team. As early as 1990, when CPBL was still in its early years, the Lions were making preparation for establishment of a second team by hiring coaches and scouting talented players for the project. The reserve team, however, was disbanded due to lack of opponent and players. In 1997, the Lions again formed a reserve team, but it met the same fate as its predecessor due to the game-fixing scandal and the decline in attendance. No further expansion was made until after the CPBL-TML merger took place.

In late 2003, after the merger of the two competing league, the Chinese Taipei Baseball Association assisted CPBL in forming a minor league by sending alternative service players to be trained by and filled the roster of member organizations of CPBL. The Lions were supportive of this project initially, but later backed out due to financial reasons. In early 2006, the Lions announced the revival of the minor league project, and began the expansion of the team. The roster consisted of reserve players, alternative service players, and non-contract players. Alternative service players and non-contract players are restricted to play exclusively on the second team. As of the 2013 season, the team is made up exclusively of contracted players.

Foreign cooperation
The Lions have been working with other organization in Asia and North America to improve the performance of the organization; collaborators includes Yomiuri Giants of NPB's Central League and Red Sox organization of MLB. Also, the Lions have participated in many friendly exhibition games with teams from other professional organizations.

Notable achievements
The Lions are the holders of many CPBL records. The most well-known is the winning streak of 17 games in the 2006 season. The Lions are currently holding the records as the team with the most wins, home runs, and Taiwan Series titles throughout its history.

Records

Regular seasons

Playoffs

Asia Series

Roster

Current roster

List of managers

See also
 Chinese Professional Baseball League
 Professional baseball in Taiwan
 Taiwan Series

References

External links

 Official website
 Chinese Professional Baseball League

Chinese Professional Baseball League teams
Baseball teams established in 1989
1989 establishments in Taiwan
Sport in Tainan